Leonard Kyle Dykstra (born February 10, 1963), is an American former professional baseball center fielder, who played in Major League Baseball (MLB) for the New York Mets (1985–1989) and Philadelphia Phillies (1989–1996). Dykstra was a three-time All-Star and won a World Series championship as a member of the 1986 Mets. Since retirement, Dykstra has been mired in financial and legal troubles. In 2009, he filed for bankruptcy. In 2011, he was arrested and charged with bankruptcy fraud, followed by grand theft auto and drug possession charges on an unrelated case, as well as indecent exposure. He served  months in federal prison.

Early life 
Dykstra attended Garden Grove High School in Orange County, California. During his senior year, he hit .494 with 50 hits on the season, which was just two short of the state record. He had a career total of 89 stolen bases, second best in state history at the time, and recorded a hit in all 27 games of his senior season. In both his junior and senior seasons he was named all-league, all-county, and all-state. He was named 3-A co-player of the year in 1981. In the Orange County All-Star baseball game he reached base all eight times he came to bat, earning five hits, a walk, and reaching base on two errors, and stole five bases. He also played football, where he was named 2nd team all-county and team MVP as a defensive back.

Baseball career

New York Mets
Dykstra was originally committed to play baseball at Arizona State University for Jim Brock but said he would sign to play professionally if drafted high enough. The Mets signed Dykstra as a 13th-round draft pick in 1981. A star in the minors, in 1983 he led the Carolina League in at-bats, runs, hits, triples, batting average and stolen bases. That season, he hit .358 with 8 HR, 81 RBI, 105 stolen bases (a league record for 17 years), 107 walks and only 35 strikeouts. He was consequently named the Carolina League's MVP, and soon emerged as one of the Mets' prized prospects.  While playing in Double-A in 1984 he befriended fellow outfielder and teammate Billy Beane, who later said that Dykstra was "perfectly designed, emotionally" to play baseball and that he had "no concept of failure." According to Beane, his first comments on seeing future Hall of Fame pitcher Steve Carlton warming up were, "Shit, I'll stick him."

In 1985 Dykstra, deemed ready for the major leagues, was promoted to the Mets when the team's starting center fielder, Mookie Wilson, was placed on the disabled list. The rookie's play and energy was a big boost to a Mets team that surged to a 98-win season and narrowly missed out on the NL East crown. The following season, Dykstra was intended to be platooned in center field with Wilson, but took over the position as outright starter and leadoff hitter when Wilson suffered a severe eye injury during spring training. Later that season, the Mets released left fielder George Foster and moved Wilson to left. Mets fans soon nicknamed Dykstra "Nails" for his hard-nosed personality and fearless play. In 1986, he even posed shirtless for a "beefcake" poster under the "Nails" nickname. Dykstra and #2 hitter Wally Backman were tagged as "The Partners in Grime" for their scrappy play as spark plugs for the star-studded Met lineup.

1986 season

With Dykstra as leadoff hitter, the 1986 Mets coasted to the division crown, beating the second-place Philadelphia Phillies by 21.5 games en route to a 108–54 season. The Mets ended up in the World Series after a  victory over the NL West champion Houston Astros in the 1986 NLCS, 4 games to 2. Dykstra hit a walk-off home run in Game 3, which is considered one of the biggest hits in Mets franchise history and of Dykstra's career. He hit .304 in the 1986 NLCS, and then .296 in the World Series against the Boston Red Sox. But his leadoff home run in Game 3 at Fenway Park sparked the Mets, who had fallen behind 2 games to none even though those games were played at Shea Stadium. The home run made him the third Met in team history (along with Tommie Agee and Wayne Garrett, both of whose home runs also came in a Game 3, in the 1969 and 1973 World Series respectively) to hit a leadoff home run in the World Series. Following Dykstra's home run, the Mets rallied to defeat the Red Sox in seven games.

1987–1989
Dykstra continued to play in a platoon with Wilson. In the 1988 NLCS against the Los Angeles Dodgers, he continued his postseason success by hitting .429 in a losing effort. But the Mets traded him to the Phillies on June 18, 1989, with pitcher Roger McDowell and minor-leaguer Tom Edens for second baseman Juan Samuel. Teammate Keith Hernandez later characterized Dykstra, in his book Pure Baseball, as being "on the wild and crazy side", which he cites as one of the reasons the Mets chose to trade him and the Phillies chose to acquire him.

Philadelphia Phillies
Dykstra was initially upset over the trade since he enjoyed playing in New York, but Phillies fans loved him and he soon became a fan favorite there as well. He was known for his trademark cheek full of tobacco and hard-nosed play. With the Phillies, Dykstra's career was marked by incredible highs and lows. In 1990, he started the All Star Game, led the league in hits and finished fourth in batting average, hitting over .400 as late as June.

Dykstra's next two seasons were marred by injury. In 1991, while driving drunk, he crashed his car into a tree on Darby-Paoli Road in Radnor Township, Delaware County, Pennsylvania. Teammate Darren Daulton, his passenger, was also injured. Dykstra suffered fractured ribs, a broken cheekbone and a fractured collarbone, and lost two months of playing time. In late August he re-broke his collarbone in Cincinnati running into the outfield wall and missed the rest of the season.

On Opening Day 1992, Dykstra was hit by a pitch that broke his hand. He played in just 145 of 324 possible games for the Phils in 1991 and 1992.

It all came together again in 1993 for Dykstra and the Phillies. The team, which had been rebuilding since its last playoff appearance ten years before, when they won the 1983 pennant but lost the World Series to Baltimore, returned to the top of the National League East and won the pennant again. He played in 161 games, setting a then major league record with 773 plate appearances. Despite being overlooked for the 1993 All-Star team he led the league in runs, hits, walks and at-bats, and was runner-up to the Giants' Barry Bonds in voting for NL Most Valuable Player. He led the Phillies into the World Series, which they lost to the defending World Series champion Toronto Blue Jays in six games. In the series, Dykstra batted .348 and hit four home runs, including two in a futile 15–14 loss at home in Game 4.

In October 2015, Dykstra told Colin Cowherd that beginning in 1993, he paid a team of private investigators $500,000 to dig up dirt on MLB umpires.  He used the information, he said, to leverage a more favorable strike zone during games.  He said it was not a coincidence that he led the Majors in walks in 1993, going from 40 in 392 plate appearances in 1992 to 129 in 773 at-bats the following year. In 1994, Dykstra walked 68 times in 386 plate appearances. Dykstra would play on two more All-Star teams in 1994 and 1995.

Retirement
Injuries plagued Dykstra for the rest of his career. He last played in 1996, although he launched one final comeback attempt in spring training of 1998 before retiring at the age of 35.

Post-baseball career
He first ran a car wash in Simi Valley, California but sold it in 2007. Dykstra was sued in relation to the car wash in 2005. The lawsuit, filed by former business partner Lindsay Jones, alleged that Dykstra used steroids and told Jones to place bets on Phillies games in 1993, when Dykstra was on that pennant-winning team. He denied those allegations, but others arose when he was cited in retrospect as a steroid-user during his playing career.

In the meantime, Dykstra managed a stock portfolio and served as president of several privately held companies, including car washes; a partnership with Castrol in "Team Dykstra" Quick Lube Centers; a ConocoPhillips fueling facility; a real estate development company; and a venture to develop several "I Sold It on eBay" stores in populous areas of southern California.  He also appeared on Fox News Channel's The Cost of Freedom business show, and his stock-picking skills were even mentioned by Jim Cramer, who had Dykstra write an investing column for TheStreet.

Dykstra then purchased NHL superstar Wayne Gretzky's $17 million estate (built at a cost of $14,999,999) hoping to flip it but was unsuccessful. At one point he owed more than $13 million on the house and Lake Sherwood security guards were eventually told to keep him away from the property because he had stripped the house of over $51,000 worth of items (countertops, an oven and hardwood flooring) and allowed the homeowners' insurance policy on the property to lapse. The house was eventually sold in January 2011 for "an undisclosed amount". Jeff Smith, the second lien holder on the former Gretzky mansion, said the property was listed on the market for $10.5 million, and sources interviewed by CNBC said that Smith "did very well" with the sale.

In 2000, Dykstra and other members of the 1986 Mets' World Championship team threw out the ceremonial first pitch before Game 5 of the World Series at Shea Stadium against the New York Yankees. In 2002, Dykstra made another much-anticipated return to New York after being elected to the Mets' 40th Anniversary All-Amazin' Team.

He returned to Shea in 2006 for the Mets' 20th-anniversary celebration of their 1986 World Championship. He then voiced a greater desire to get back into baseball and his name surfaced as a possible Mets coach or even manager. He also served as part-time instructor at the Mets' spring training camp in Port St. Lucie.

He came back to Flushing for the last time on September 28, 2008 for the Farewell to Shea Stadium ceremony held after the final game of that season.

Starting in 2016, Dykstra has become a recurring guest on the Barstool Sports' podcast segment, Locker Room Talk, during Pardon My Take hosted by Dan "Big Cat" Katz and PFT Commenter. The segment involved the hosts prank-calling Dykstra's personal cell phone and asking him vulgar questions. Most instances of Locker Room Talk end with Dykstra angrily hanging up.

In the book 108 Stitches (2019) by former teammate Ron Darling, it was alleged that Dykstra hurled racist taunts at Red Sox pitcher Oil Can Boyd from the on-deck circle during the 1986 World Series. Dykstra publicly and vociferously denied the story and was publicly supported in his denial by former teammates Dwight Gooden, Kevin Mitchell, Darryl Strawberry and Wally Backman. Dykstra attempted to sue Darling for defamation in April 2020 but the case was dismissed on June 1, 2020, with the judge citing Dykstra's documented reputation as being "among other things, racist, misogynist and anti-gay, as well as a sexual predator, a drug-abuser, a thief and an embezzler" as the reason.

House of Nails: A Memoir of Life on the Edge 
On June 28, 2016, Dykstra released an autobiography titled House of Nails: A Memoir of Life on the Edge.

House of Nails landed at No. 11 on the New York Times nonfiction best-seller list for July 17, 2016.

Rebound Finance 
On October 5, 2016, Dykstra and Rebound Finance, a credit referral company, announced their partnership. The partnership is still ongoing with Dykstra acting as the brand's ambassador. According to a press release published by Rebound Finance, the main goal of the partnership is to "provide hard working Americans with the credit they deserve."

Media appearances 
To promote his new book and then, later on, his partnership with Rebound Finance, Dykstra made several media appearances in 2016.

On June 28, 2016, Dykstra appeared on The Howard Stern Show for the first stop on his promotional tour for his bestselling book House of Nails: A Memoir of Life on the Edge and to discuss his sexual conquests.

On July 27, 2016, Dykstra appeared on Larry King Now to discuss his book, his MLB career, his use of steroids, and his close friendship with Charlie Sheen.

On November 28, 2016, Dykstra returned to The Howard Stern Show, bringing with him two women to verify the claims he made during his first visit in June. Dykstra also promoted his partnership with Rebound Finance.

Then, on December 17, 2019, Dykstra returned again to The Howard Stern Show playing on Stern's "Hollyweird Squares" game.

Personal life

Family

Dykstra’s wife, Terri, filed for divorce in April 2009.

Dykstra's son, Cutter, was drafted by the Milwaukee Brewers in the second round of the 2008 Major League Baseball Draft, and played in the Washington Nationals organization until being released on June 14, 2016. Through Cutter's relationship with actress Jamie-Lynn Sigler, Dykstra has two grandsons. Another son, Luke, was drafted by the Atlanta Braves in the seventh round of the 2014 MLB Draft and last played for the Sugar Land Skeeters of the Atlantic League of Professional Baseball in 2018.

Dykstra's uncles, Pete, Jack, and Tony, played in the National Hockey League.

Mitchell Report; steroid use
Dykstra was named in the Mitchell Report on steroid use in Major League Baseball on December 13, 2007. The report cited multiple sources, including Kirk Radomski, as stating that Dykstra had used anabolic steroids during his MLB career. It also stated that the Commissioner of Baseball's office had known about Dykstra's steroid use since 2000. Dykstra did not agree to meet with the Mitchell investigators to discuss the allegations.

In Randall Lane's book The Zeroes, Dykstra admitted in his hotel room to Lane, editor of Trader Monthly, that he used steroids to perform better than those he felt might replace him; otherwise, his $25 million would be "on the line".

On December 20, 2007, Dykstra was also named in former MLB pitcher Jason Grimsley's unsealed affidavit as an alleged user of steroids.

Business affairs
In September 2008, Dykstra began a high-end jet charter company and magazine marketed to professional athletes known as the Player's Club, LLC. The magazine was part of a business plan to offer financial advice to professional athletes, according to a profile article in The New Yorker magazine, Dykstra had a website entitled "Nails Investments" to impart information about his investment ideas.

In early 2009, stories and evidence began to emerge indicating that Dykstra's financial empire was in a tailspin. A GQ article by Kevin P. Coughlin, a former photo editor for the New York Post, detailed Coughlin's 67-day employment with Dykstra producing The Players Club, a magazine geared toward athletes and their expensive lifestyles. Coughlin detailed incidents and accused Dykstra of credit card fraud, failure to pay rent on the magazine's Park Avenue offices or for bounced checks, lawsuits, and printing costs.

An extensive article about an ESPN.com investigation in April 2009 went into greater detail, asserting that Dykstra has been the subject of at least two dozen legal actions since 2007.

Bankruptcy
Dykstra, whose net worth was estimated at $58 million in 2008, filed for Chapter 11 bankruptcy in July 2009, listing less than $50,000 in assets against $10 million to $50 million in liabilities. He claimed to be a victim of mortgage fraud, after he lost the house purchased for $17.5 million from Wayne Gretzky to foreclosure, in the Sherwood Country Club development in Thousand Oaks, California.

According to the July 7, 2009, petition in the Bankruptcy Court for the Central District of California  Dykstra's debts and creditors include $12.9m to Washington Mutual (unsecured), $4m to Countrywide Financial /Bank of America (unsecured), $3.5m to Rockridge Bank of Atlanta, $2.5m to David and Teresa Litt, $1.5m to K&L Gates (a large law firm), and smaller amounts to others.

In August 2009, Dykstra was living out of his car and in hotel lobbies. The estate he had purchased from Gretzky was riddled with water damage, torn-up flooring, missing toilets, and other major damage. His second house, also in the Sherwood development, was uninhabitable due to toxic mold. A dispute with his insurance carrier over reimbursement for the necessary repairs. Fireman's Fund Insurance Company provided Dykstra and his wife with a temporary residence pending resolution of the outstanding claim. According to papers filed in court, one of the houses in question was in "unshowable" condition as "the home was littered throughout with empty beer bottles, trash, dog feces and urine, and other unmentionables." Raw sewage had been leaking inside the house, and electrical wiring had been damaged or removed by vandals.

On October 6, 2009, the Wall Street Journal reported that Dykstra's World Series ring had been auctioned off for $56,762 "to help pay the former major-leaguer's $31 million debt." On November 20, 2009, the case was converted to a Chapter 7 bankruptcy to liquidate the estate and pay creditors.

In June 2010, a court-appointed federal trustee in Dykstra's bankruptcy case charged he had lied under oath, improperly hidden and sold assets, and repeatedly acted "in a fraudulent and deceitful manner" during his ongoing bankruptcy case. The trustee accordingly asked the bankruptcy court to deny Dykstra's request for a bankruptcy discharge.

Legal issues
In 1991, Dykstra crashed his red Mercedes-Benz SL 500 into a tree on Darby-Paoli Road in Radnor Township, Pennsylvania, after attending the bachelor party of Phillies teammate John Kruk. Dykstra suffered broken ribs, a broken collarbone and a broken facial bone, in addition to second-degree burns on his left arm and lower back. Darren Daulton, also a teammate, was a passenger in the car at the time; his injuries included an injured eye and a broken facial bone. According to Radnor Township Police, Dykstra's blood alcohol content was measured at 0.179% shortly after the crash, over double the legal limit of 0.08% in the state.

In 1999, he was arrested for sexual harassment of a 17-year-old girl who worked at his car wash. The criminal charges were later dropped.

In March 2009, press reports alleged that Dykstra's businesses were facing financial ruin. They also alleged that he had used offensive terms when speaking about blacks, women, and homosexuals.

In September 2009, he was banned from both of his foreclosed multimillion-dollar properties in Lake Sherwood, from which security officers were instructed to deny him access. He was accused of vandalizing the properties, and not maintaining homeowners' insurance on them, and the court assigned a trustee to manage them.

In December 2010, Dykstra was accused of hiring a female escort, and then writing her a bad $1,000 check: adult entertainment star and escort Monica Foster claimed he had hired her on December 13, 2010, and then wrote her a worthless check. Foster later posted a copy of the check on her blog.
 
In January 2011, Dykstra was accused of sexual assault by his housekeeper. She alleged that he would force her to give him oral sex. The woman told investigators "she needed the job and the money, so she went along with the suspect's requests rather than lose her job," according to the filing, and "returned to work in the suspect's home with knowledge obtained from the Internet about a claim of sexual assault by another woman."

In April, 2011, the Los Angeles Police Department Commercial Crimes Division arrested Dykstra on separate grand theft charges, related to the purchase of vehicles. He was held on $500,000 bail. On April 13, 2011, Dykstra was arrested for investigation of grand theft by Los Angeles police at his Encino home on suspicion of trying to buy a stolen car, the day after Dykstra, in an unrelated federal complaint, had been charged with embezzling from a bankruptcy estate. He faced up to five years in federal prison if convicted. Federal prosecutors contended that after filing for bankruptcy Dykstra hid, sold, or destroyed more than $400,000 worth of items from the $18.5 million mansion in question without permission of a bankruptcy trustee. The items allegedly ranged from sports memorabilia to a $50,000 sink. At one point, he sold "a truckload of furnishing and fixtures" for cash at a consignment store, according to a statement from the U.S. attorney's office.

In May 2011, Dykstra was sentenced to house arrest after his bankruptcy fraud indictment. Under the terms of his plea agreement, he had been allowed to leave the house only to go to work, attend church, or undergo mandatory drug testing. On June 13, 2011, Dykstra appeared in Federal bankruptcy court and pleaded not guilty to 13 charges. He was represented by a public defender.  Dykstra faced up to 80 years in prison if convicted of all charges relating to embezzlement, obstruction of justice, bankruptcy fraud, making false statements to bankruptcy court, and concealing property from the bankruptcy court. The bankruptcy fraud trial was set to start on June 5, 2012.

On June 6, 2011, Dykstra was arrested and charged with 25 misdemeanor and felony counts of grand theft auto, identity theft, filing false financial statements and possession of cocaine, ecstasy and the human growth hormone (HGH) known as somatropin. He first pleaded not guilty to the charges, but later changed his plea to no contest to grand theft auto and providing false financial statements in exchange for dropping the drug charges. On March 5, 2012, after unsuccessfully trying to withdraw his nolo-contendere plea, he was sentenced to three years in state prison, receiving nearly a year's credit for time already served. According to court records and press reports, Dykstra and confederates had obtained automobiles from various car dealerships using falsified bank statements and stolen identities.

On August 25, 2011, Dykstra was charged with indecent exposure. The Los Angeles City Attorney accused him of placing ads on Craigslist requesting a personal assistant or housekeeping services. The victims alleged that when they arrived, they were informed that the job also required massage service. Dykstra would then disrobe and expose himself. He was given a nine-month sentence for lewd conduct.

On July 13, 2012, Dykstra pleaded guilty in federal court to three felonies: one count each of bankruptcy fraud, concealment of assets, and money laundering. He admitted to hiding, selling, or destroying over $400,000 worth of items that were supposed to be part of his bankruptcy filing. On December 3, 2012, he was sentenced to six and half months in prison and 500 hours of community service, and ordered to pay $200,000 in restitution.

Dykstra was released from the federal penitentiary in Victorville, California, in June 2013 after serving six and a half months of his sentence for the bankruptcy fraud and money laundering charges, which ran concurrently with the grand theft auto and false financial statements charges.
As part of his release, he was required to serve three years of supervised release, including 500 hours of community service, enroll in a substance abuse program, submit to drug testing, and pay $200,000 to his creditors.

He finished his probation in April 2014, and had undergone weekly drug testing. Now he lives with his ex-wife, Terri, who said that she has no plans to remarry him.

On May 23, 2018, Dykstra was arrested after uttering terroristic threats and for possession of drugs. He allegedly held a gun to his Uber driver after the driver refused to change destinations. On October 10, 2018, Dykstra was indicted by a New Jersey grand jury for cocaine and methamphetamine possession, and making terroristic threats.

See also
 List of Major League Baseball players named in the Mitchell Report

References

Further reading 
 
 
 
 
 
Kashatus, William C. (2017) Macho Row: The 1993 Phillies and Baseball's Unwritten Code.  University of Nebraska Press

External links

Lenny Dykstra at SABR (Baseball BioProject)
Lenny Dykstra at Baseball Almanac
Lenny Dykstra at Baseballbiography.com
Lenny Dykstra at Ultimate Mets Database

1963 births
American people of Frisian descent
Baseball players from California

Jackson Mets players
Leones del Caracas players
American expatriate baseball players in Venezuela
Living people
Major League Baseball center fielders
Lynchburg Mets players
National League All-Stars
New York Mets players
Philadelphia Phillies players
Scranton/Wilkes-Barre Red Barons players
Shelby Mets players
Sportspeople from Santa Ana, California
Tidewater Tides players
American people convicted of fraud
American sportspeople convicted of crimes
American people convicted of assault
Prisoners and detainees of the United States federal government
People convicted of money laundering